Sandra Heim-Dopfer (born 25 May 1970 in Lustenau as Sandra Dopfer) is a former Austrian tennis player.

Heim-Dopfer won six singles titles on the ITF tour in her career. On 29 August 1994, she reached her best singles ranking of world number 70. On 19 July 1993, she peaked at world number 102 in the doubles rankings.

Heim-Dopfer made one appearance for the Austria Fed Cup team in July 1993. Her best Grand Slam result was in 1996, making the third round of that year's US Open.

After her tennis career, Sandra Heim-Dopfer worked for the charitable organisation Caritas Vorarlberg. In 2004, she married Michael Heim, an Austrian architect. They have two children. 

During her career, Sandra Heim-Dopfer had learned about various healing methods as well as the power of mindfulness and she used several relaxation and visualisation techniques. In 2001, she started years of training in meditation and metaphysical healing and has been following her passion to help people ever since: She opened her meditation center in Dornbirn (Aut) in 2012.

ITF finals (6–5)

Singles (6–4)

Doubles (0–1)

Fed Cup participation

Singles

References

External links 
 
 
 

1970 births
Living people
People from Lustenau
Austrian female tennis players
Sportspeople from Vorarlberg